Lane R. Lord (born May 19, 1971) is an American college women's basketball coach currently coaching at the University of Texas Rio Grande Valley. He was previously the head coach at Pittsburg State University, a position he held from 2007 to 2018. While Lord was at Pittsburg State, the program won a conference regular season championships and appeared in four NCAA tournaments. Prior to his most recent post, Lord was the head coach for at Barton Community College from 2004 to 2007, where he led the school to three consecutive winning seasons, and one Kansas Jayhawk Community College Conference West Division co-regular season championship. Lord also taught and coached at Wichita Heights High School from 1995 to 2004.

Career

High school career 
Lord, a Waco, Texas native, began his coaching career in 1995 at Wichita Heights High School, where he spent nine seasons as the head coach leading the women's basketball team to two state tournament championships, six sub-state tournaments, four City League conference championships, and three state tournament appearances.

Barton Community College 
After nine seasons at the high school level, Lord was named the Barton Community College head women's basketball coach. During his three seasons at Barton, Lord led the Cougars three consecutive 20-plus win seasons, one Kansas Jayhawk Community College Conference West Division co-regular season championship, and two trips to the National Junior College Athletic Association Regional VI tournament.

Pittsburg State University 
In April 2007, Pittsburg State University announced that Lord would become the new head coach for the women's basketball team. During his time at Pittsburg State, an NCAA Division II school, the Gorillas have won one conference regular season championship, have made five NCAA Division II Tournament appearances, and Lord has earned the MIAA Coach of the Year award five times – 2009, 2012, 2014, 2016, and 2017.

University of Texas at Rio Grande Valley 
On May 21, 2018, Lord was named the head coach for the Texas–Rio Grande Valley Vaqueros women's basketball program.

Head coach record

References

External links
 Texas–Rio Grande Valley profile
 Pittsburg State profile

1971 births
Living people
American women's basketball coaches
Basketball coaches from Texas
Tabor College (Kansas) alumni
Friends University alumni
Barton Cougars women's basketball coaches
Pittsburg State Gorillas women's basketball coaches
Sportspeople from Waco, Texas
UT Rio Grande Valley Vaqueros women's basketball coaches